Cathedral School is a private, Catholic K-12 in Natchez, Mississippi, United States. It is located in the Roman Catholic Diocese of Jackson.

Background
Cathedral School was founded in 1847, just five years after the formation of the first Catholic Diocese and Catholic Church in Mississippi. It has remained in continuous operation for 160 years. The school was originally staffed by the Daughters of Charity who remained on staff until 2003.

Notes and references

External links
 Cathedral School

Buildings and structures in Natchez, Mississippi
Educational institutions established in 1847
Roman Catholic Diocese of Jackson
Catholic secondary schools in Mississippi
Schools in Adams County, Mississippi
1847 establishments in Mississippi
Private K-12 schools in Mississippi